Organica Technologies is an organization that builds wastewater treatment plants that can be used in agriculture, irrigation or municipal areas using patented technology.  The company’s goal is to treat, recycle, and conserve wastewater. Organica treatment plants are smaller than traditional options, and are created in greenhouses.  Founded in 1998, Organica is headquartered in Budapest, Hungary, with branch offices in India, Singapore, and the United States.

History
By the end of its first year in operation, Organica attracted a number of investors, including Environmental Investment Partners and the Swiss government. In December 2006, Organica signed a joint venture agreement with Veolia Water Solutions and Technologies.  Organica sold its share in this venture in 2009. Organica has been a completely independent entity since.

Technology
Organica's wastewater treatment processes the water with the use of living organisms, specifically a 'Fixed-Bed Biofilm Activated Sludge' process. The organism's ability to self-organize maximizes biological degradation of contaminants. The treatment plants enhance the natural forces used to purify water by harnessing the metabolic processes of living organism's ability to digest organic pollutants. The diversity of self-managing organisms provides a highly robust system resulting in a stable system. The clean water can be reused for irrigation, cooling towers, toilet usages, and other non-potable needs.

Awards

 Nomination for the European Business Awards for the Environment 2010 by the Hungarian Jury for the EU Environmental Awards
 The "Environment Award" 2008 given by the Association of Environmental Manufacturers and Service Providers
 Silver Merit Cross of the Republic of Hungary 2005 given to Mr. István Kenyeres, co-founder of ORGANICA for his contribution to the development of the environmental industry in Hungary
 Frost & Sullivan Innovation Prize 2005 for the ORGANICA Technology wastewater treatment solution
 The "Environment Award" 2004 given by the Association of Environmental Manufacturers and Service Providers
 Innovation Award 2004 given by the Hungarian Innovation Foundation
 Company of the Year 2004 given by the Hungarian Venture Capital and Private Equity Association

References

External links
 
 https://web.archive.org/web/20200213003327/http://www.aecom.com/What%2BWe%2BDo/Water/_news/AECOM%2Bpartners%2Bwith%2BOrganica%2BEcotechnologies
 https://web.archive.org/web/20100616101920/http://www.aashe.org/membership/members/business_members
 http://www.presidentsclimatecommitment.org/supporters/corporate
 http://www.waterworld.com/index/display/article-display/353607/articles/waterworld/projects-contracts/dunapack-hungary-gets-anaerobic-wastewater-treatment-from-veolia.html
 http://pericles.ipaustralia.gov.au/ols/auspat/quickSearch.do?queryString=Organica&resultsPerPage=#
 http://www.actu-environnement.com/ae/news/installation-epuration-eaux-usees-filtres-plantes-11326.php4
 http://www.richmondbizsense.com/2010/11/26/blue-is-the-new-green/
 http://www.actu-environnement.com/ae/news/installation-epuration-eaux-usees-filtres-plantes-11326.php4
 https://web.archive.org/web/20120711215901/http://www.plantworksystems.com/organica_Food_Chain_Reactor.shtml

Companies based in Budapest